Black Samurai is a 1977 American blaxploitation martial arts spy action adventure film directed by Al Adamson and starring Jim Kelly. Produced by BJLJ International, with Executive Producer Laurence Joachim and screenplay credited to B. Readick, with additional story ideas from Marco Joachim.  The film is based on a novel of the same name, by Marc Olden.

Plot
Robert Sand, agent of D.R.A.G.O.N. (Defense Reserve Agency Guardian Of Nations), is playing tennis on his vacation with a beautiful black girl, when his commanding officers ask him to save a Chinese girl named Toki who happens to be Sand's girlfriend, and the daughter of a top Eastern Ambassador. The ransom for the abduction was the secret for a terrific new weapon - the freeze bomb - but the 'Warlock' behind the deed is also into the business of drug dealing and Voodoo ritual murders. The search takes him from Hong Kong to California through Miami, and plenty of action, against bad men, bad girls, and bad animals.

Cast
 Jim Kelly as Robert Sand
 Bill Roy as Janicot
 Roberto Contreras as Chavez
 Marilyn Joi as Synne
 Essie Lin Chia as Toki Konuma
 Biff Yeager as Pines
 Charles Grant as "Bone"
 Jace Khan as Jace
 Erwin Fuller as Bodyguard 
 Grace St. Esprit as Cleo
 Peter Dane as Farnsworth
 Felix Silla as Rheinhardt
 Cowboy Lang as himself
 Little Tokyo as himself
 Jerry Marin as Spiro "Shotgun Spiro"
 Alfonso Walters as Leopard Man
 Charles Walter Johnson as Leopard Man
 Regina Carrol as Voodoo Dancer / Party Guest (as Gina Adamson)
 Jesus Thillet as Martial Arts Fighter
 Cliff Bowen as Martial Arts Fighter
 D'Urville Martin (uncredited)
 Aldo Ray as DRAGON Chief (uncredited)

See also
 Yasuke – a real life black samurai who lived during the Sengoku period of ancient Japanese history

References

External links

1977 films
American martial arts films
Blaxploitation films
Films based on American novels
Films directed by Al Adamson
1977 martial arts films
1970s English-language films
1970s American films